Scatterheart is a Canadian band formed in 2007 in Vancouver, British Columbia. The band is notable for its music videos, a number of which are or have been in rotation on MuchMusic and MuchMore. These Canadian music television stations have provided Scatterheart several MuchFACT and PromoFACT grants based on merit, with funds to be applied to music video development. Scatterheart is also notable for its enthusiastic following in South Korea, a country where the band has played on two separate Asian tours.

Scatterheart 1.0: 2007 to 2010
Feathers were a trademark of early Scatterheart shows. Lead singer Enright strutted the stage in one of two sets of brightly colored feathered wings, and the audience often had the opportunity to share in the fun, as described on Lanarama's Bizarre Stage Antics: “Scatterheart had a feather cannon that would shoot feathers out over the crowd at their album release party” Scatterheart publicist Cristy Laubman,  in conversation with Georgia Straight writer Adrian Mack speculated that the man might actually use his wings to fly. Ronatron had this to say about the group's performance at a legendary Vancouver venue: "After the bricks have fallen and the lights turned off, I want to take a moment and step back in time and relive one of the best shows I have ever been to at Richard’s on Richards. . . on that normal night, when no one actually believed that this venue was actually going to torn down, a local band by the name of Scatterheart utterly blew my mind with their amazing showmanship and tight instrumentals. I can honestly say that this was one of the best shows I have ever witnessed at Richard’s on Richards." Regarding an earlier performance, Cordmag stated: "This was the highlight of the festival so far. Scatterheart made it worth it if nothing else." Spun concedes: "If you weren't dripping in loverockrevolution by the end, there is something wrong with you. Scatterheart is a positive, high energy, rock n roll show that DEMANDS you be entertained." With regards to international performance, the challenges of performing at a festival halfway around the globe are defined thus: "Fury mentioned that learning to say “Scatterheart loves you!” in Korean was the first order of business, along with a couple of radio and TV interviews." Rob Michaels of Mountain 102.1 FM Radio in Whistler/Squamish, B.C., became a Scatterheart fan after hearing the group at the 2009 Telus World Ski and Snowboard event. Intrigued by the sight of a man wandering around Whistler wearing multi-colored feathers, Rob later invited the group to his studio for both an extensive interview and an acoustic performance of the song Beautiful. Scatterheart guitarist Doug Fury regaled Michaels with stories of the group's festival experience in Busan, Korea: the initial ecstatic reaction of the crowd of 25,000 as the group came out on the stage led Doug to comment to Mike, Jesse, and Wes that “Dudes, this is going to go off!” and, later, to note that a crowd of that size felt “just about right!” During the interview, Rob also reminded his listening audience about the upcoming First Night 2010 show in the outdoor stadium at Whistler Olympic Park, at which Scatterheart was a featured group.

Scatterheart 2.0
Following the departure of Enright from Scatterheart in November, 2010, the remaining three members of Scatterheart contemplated a future without feathers.

Quitting was not an option, and the band continued to rehearse and write collaboratively. Over the next year, they wrote and album's worth of songs that featured Doug and Mike sharing lead vocal duty.

In Coquitlam on Canada Day, July 1, 2012, Scatterheart 2.0 made their debut as a power trio.

Doug and Mike are music producers with their own recording studios, and both are photographers and videographers as well. Mike has scripted and produced over 30 music videos for clients in a number of genres, while Wes is a computer programmer with extensive knowledge of the Web.

This unique blend of strengths has allowed Scatterheart to produce a series of interactive music videos.

Scatterheart 2.0 Music Videos

Scatterheart 2.0's first video, titled Better Than Before takes the form of a bizarre obstacle race between band members, and is programmed to allow viewers to choose their own winner and produce that outcome as a video.

The second video, Awesome Machine features a Rubric's-Cube-like split screen throughout, making it possible for the viewer to create an amalgam of Wes's, Doug's, and Mike's faces, as a series of nine avatars that the band collectively dubs 'Mr. Ugly'.

The video for I Get The Feeling We've Hit The Ceiling is another first in the world of music video, filmed underwater on a submerged stage, a problematic shoot made even more difficult by the fact that drums and guitars float. Using compressed or surface air, Mike sings entire verses without taking a breath.

MuchMusic's VideoFACT and MuchMore's PromoFACT provided funding for the development of two of these videos.

Scatterheart 2.0 Personnel
Doug Fury: guitar and vocals. Doug is a recording engineer and producer in Vancouver (Fortissimo Sound), and has toured as Bif Naked's guitarist for over 10 years. Mike Southworth: drums and vocals. Mike is a recording engineer and producer in North Vancouver (Creativ) and producer of music videos for Hilary Grist and Dominique Fricot, among others. Wes Deboer: bass and back vocals. In real life, Wes is a computer software designer and recreational hockey player.

Discography Scatterheart 1.0
Scatterheart EP (the Black Album), released 2007
1.Desire
2.Say It
3.New Foundation
4.Shadows
5.Soothe
6. Good Night Angel

The Masterplan, released 2009
1.Beautiful
2. We Are Stars
3.Maria
4. The Free
5.More Than A Man
6.You Try
7.Shut Up
8.My Love
9.Donna Don't Give Up
10.Take A Look Around
11.Sons and Daughters Of the Drum

In response to the new album, BC Musician Magazine's Patrick Jacobson  notes that: “Scatterheart's songs burrow through their victim's ear canals to their brains, leaving them in a highly suggestive state. This album begs to be cranked up LOUD.” The earlier album caught the attention of AntiMusic's Morley Seaver, who ranted: “The record is a livewire, full of enthusiasm and power” and further, that Scatterheart is a band capable of “. . . punching holes in the speakers with their energetic rock.” Seaver concludes: “If this is just the beginning of Scatterheart, it's inevitable that you'll be hearing about them for a long time. They have the chops, the songs and the delivery to engage your ears. And I know their live show will be up to the task as well, having seen Mr. Fury many times. Scatter your heart to the winds over this record, people….Doug Fury and company will piece it back together for you.” Ferdy Belland called the album a ". . .crazy-like-a-fox melding of Jane's Addiction alternative-psychedelia inside stunning three-minute pop nuggets." The production on the album was almost too good for Georgia Straight reviewer John Lucas, who noted: “ Someone in the Scatterheart camp evidently has money burning a hole in his pocket. . .  it’s obvious that someone spent a pretty penny on the recording too. The sound is slick and professional, with the songs falling somewhere between modern rock and ’80s pop. . .” Possibly, Lucas did not realize that two members of Scatterheart are producers/sound engineers, and therefore have access to high quality sound recording technology. Further consideration of the album led Adrian Mack of Georgia Straight to state: “First single “Beautiful” is both glamtastic and generally wonderful enough to give Nick Gilder a good case of the vapours, “More Than a Man” cheekily pushes Bowie’s “Fame” (David Bowie) in new and harder directions, and “Sons and Daughters of the Drum” takes 5,000-fingered Rick Wakeman keyboard ostentation and plunks it in the middle of a song you can actually hum along with (something Wakeman never quite figured out). .. Scatterheart loves you? The feeling appears to be mutual.” As well, Spun Magazine rated Master Plan as one of the Top Ten albums of the year.

Music Videos Scatterheart 1.0
The 2009 video for the song Beautiful featured an innovative script written and directed by the group members themselves. Billed as 'One Camera, One Shot, No Special Effects' this video was an antidote to the expensive and over-produced music videos that have become an expectation of the industry. Singer Enright performed in his characteristic wings, while feathers, balloons, hearts, bubbles, and other paraphernalia floated upwards as if by magic. Occasionally, the other band members appeared,  apparently playing their instruments while upside down. The companion video Making Us Beautiful reveals the secret: Jesse was hanging upside down, suspended from a scaffold while wearing a climbing harness  under his feathers. With the camera also positioned upside down, friends tossing various flying objects from the scaffold, and the rest of the band sneaking into the shot with instruments in hand, the effect was complete. The 2009 video for the song "More Than A Man", which featured typical Scatterheart antics with the stunning Vancouver skyline as a backdrop, was in rotation in 2009 at MuchMusic. A third video, based on the song "The Free" featured concert footage from the 10th Annual International Rock Festival in Busan, South Korea.

References

Canadian alternative rock groups
Musical groups established in 2007
Musical groups from Vancouver
Canadian pop rock music groups
2007 establishments in British Columbia